The 1934 World Table Tennis Championships men's doubles was the eighth edition of the men's doubles championship. The Championships were held in December 1933 but are officially listed as the 1934 Championships.
Miklós Szabados and Viktor Barna defeated Sándor Glancz and Tibor Házi in the final by three sets to nil. Barna once again playing with Szabados, won his sixth consecutive doubles title.

Results

See also
List of World Table Tennis Championships medalists

References

-